Kazumasa (written: 数正, 和正, 和昌, 和政, 一眞, 一正, 一将, 一存, 一政 or 員昌) is a masculine Japanese given name. Notable people with the name include:

, Japanese baseball player
, Japanese musician
, Japanese writer
, Japanese weightlifter
, Japanese samurai
, Japanese samurai
, Japanese samurai
, Japanese footballer
, Japanese baseball player
, Japanese singer-songwriter and composer
, Japanese photographer
, Japanese badminton player
, Japanese ice hockey player
, Japanese daimyō
, Japanese footballer
, Japanese samurai
, Japanese footballer
, Japanese boxer
, Japanese footballer
, Japanese baseball player

Japanese masculine given names